Malaysia competed in the 1983 Southeast Asian Games held in Singapore from 28 May to 6 June 1983.

Medal summary

Medals by sport

Medallists

Football

Men's tournament
Group A

Semifinal

Bronze medal match

References

1983
Nations at the 1983 Southeast Asian Games